The Christian (1923) is a silent film drama, released by Goldwyn Pictures,  directed by Maurice Tourneur, his first production for Goldwyn, and starring Richard Dix and Mae Busch. The film is based on the novel The Christian by Hall Caine, published in 1897, the first British novel to reach the record of one million copies sold. The novel was adapted for the stage, opening on Broadway at the Knickerbocker Theatre October 10, 1898. This was the fourth film of the story; the first, The Christian (1911) was made in Australia.

Plot

John Storm becomes a Christian Socialist, intending to live as Christ would live. He struggles to free himself from his love for Glory Quayle. John and Glory had been childhood sweethearts while growing up in the Isle of Man. As adults they travel to London where Glory becomes a nurse and finally a star on the stage. John enters the church. Later scenes show John's struggles, the meeting of the couple at the race track, his determination to kill Glory to save her from herself and his death in Glory's arms after a stoning by an infuriated mob.

Cast
 Richard Dix as John Storm
 Mae Busch as Glory Quayle
 Gareth Hughes as Brother Paul
 Phyllis Haver as Polly Love
 Cyril Chadwick as Lord Robert Ure
 Mahlon Hamilton as Horatio Drake
 Joseph J. Dowling as Father Lampleigh
 Claude Gillingwater as Lord Storm
 John Herdman as Parson Quayle
 Beryl Mercer as Liza
 Robert Bolder as Reverend Golightly
 Milla Davenport as Matron
 Alice Hesse as Mary
 Aileen Pringle as Lady Robert Ure
 Harry Northrup as Faro King
 Eric Mayne as Doctor
 William F. Moran as Coroner

Production background
The film is based on the novel and play by Hall Caine. On the Broadway stage Viola Allen, played Glory Quayle in 1899. This was the fourth, and last, silent era filming of the story, with previous versions made in 1911 The Christian (Australian), 1914 and 1915. Some filming for this production was done in the United Kingdom.

After the screen version of The Christian was written by Charles Kenyon it was approved by Hall Caine. J. G. Hawks prepared the continuity for the production.

Maurice Tourneur, with the Goldwyn players, headed by Richard Dix and Mae Busch travelled to the Isle of Man for exterior filming where they were joined by Hall Caine who co-operated in the filming of his work and held daily conferences with Tourneur.

Preservation status
The Christian is extant with copies at the George Eastman House, Museum of Modern Art and British Film Institute National Archive.

References

External links

1923 films
American silent feature films
Films directed by Maurice Tourneur
American films based on plays
Films based on British novels
Goldwyn Pictures films
1923 drama films
Films based on multiple works
Silent American drama films
Films set in England
American black-and-white films
1920s American films